Pareiorhaphis vetula is a species of catfish in the family Loricariidae. It is native to South America, where it occurs in the headwaters of the Doce River basin in the state of Minas Gerais in Brazil. The species reaches at least 4.9 cm (1.9 inches) in standard length. It was described in 2016 by Edson H. L. Pereira (of the Pontifical Catholic University of Rio Grande do Sul), Pablo Lehmann A., and Roberto Esser dos Reis (also of the Pontifical Catholic University of Rio Grande do Sul). FishBase does not yet list this species.

References 

Loricariidae
Fish described in 2016
Catfish of South America
Fish of the Doce River basin